Gripsholm Castle is a 1963 West German romantic comedy film directed by Kurt Hoffmann and starring Jana Brejchová, Walter Giller and Hanns Lothar. It is based on Kurt Tucholsky's novel Schloss Gripsholm.

The film's sets were designed by the art director Otto Pischinger. Location shooting took place around Hamburg and at the real Gripsholm Castle in Sweden. It was filmed in Eastmancolor.

Cast
 Jana Brejchová as Prinzessin Lydia
 Walter Giller as Kurt
 Hanns Lothar as Karlchen
 Nadja Tiller as Billie
 Agnes Windeck as Frau Kremser
 Carl-Gustaf Lindstedt as Herr Bengtson
 Ekkehard Fritsch as Tourist
 Inge Wolffberg as Touristin
 Willy Witte
 Ewald Wenck
 Ilse Trautschold

See also
Gripsholm (2000)

References

Bibliography 
 Hans-Michael Bock and Tim Bergfelder. The Concise Cinegraph: An Encyclopedia of German Cinema. Berghahn Books, 2009.

External links 
 

1963 films
1963 romantic comedy films
German romantic comedy films
West German films
1960s German-language films
Films directed by Kurt Hoffmann
Films set in Sweden
Films based on German novels
Films about vacationing
Gloria Film films
1960s German films